The Australia national association football team represented Australia at the OFC Nations Cup from 1980 to 2004.

OFC Nations Cup record

1980 OFC Nations Cup

Group B

Final

1996 OFC Nations Cup

Semi-final

Final

1998 OFC Nations Cup

Group B

Semi-final

Final

2000 OFC Nations Cup

Group A

Semi-final

Final

2002 OFC Nations Cup

Group A

Semi-final

Final

2004 OFC Nations Cup

Group stage

Final

Goalscorers

See also
 Australia at the AFC Asian Cup

References

Countries at the OFC Nations Cup
Australia national soccer team